Bisque is a smooth, creamy, highly seasoned soup of French origin, classically based on a strained broth (coulis) of crustaceans. It can be made from lobster, langoustine, crab, shrimp or crayfish. Alongside chowder, bisque is one of the most popular seafood soups.

Etymology 

It is thought the name is derived from Biscay, as in Bay of Biscay.

The term 'bisque' is also sometimes used to refer to cream-based soups that do not contain seafood, in which the pre-cooked ingredients are pureed or processed in a food processor or a food mill. Common varieties include squash, tomato, mushroom, and red pepper.

Method 

Bisque is a method of extracting flavor from imperfect crustaceans not good enough to send to market. In an authentic bisque, the shells are ground to a fine paste and added to thicken the soup. Julia Child even remarked, "Do not wash anything off until the soup is done because you will be using the same utensils repeatedly and you don't want any marvelous tidbits of flavor losing themselves down the drain."  Bisques are thickened with rice, which can either be strained out, leaving behind the starch, or pureed during the final stages.

See also

 List of crab dishes
 List of cream soups
 List of French soups and stews
 List of seafood dishes
 List of soups

References 

Crab dishes
Cream soups
Fish and seafood soups
French soups
Lobster dishes
Occitan cuisine